Interior Design is an American interior design magazine, which has been in circulation since 1932.

History and profile

Interior Design was founded by Harry V. Anderson in Manhattan in 1932. He was also the publisher and editor of the magazine, which temporarily ceased publication during World War II. Following the war Anderson and John Hay Whitney of Whitney Communications Company relaunched the magazine. In 1959 the company became the sole owner of Interior Design. Harry V. Anderson served as the editor and publisher until 1969.

The other editors have included Donald D. Macmillan; Sherman R. Emery, from 1960 to 1983; and Stanley Abercrombie. The current editor is Cindy Allen. In 1984 Cahners Publishing, later Reed Business Information, bought the magazine from Whitney Communications Company. Sandow Media acquired the magazine in March 2010. The magazine is headquartered in New York City.

See also

 List of United States magazines

References

 Macmillan, Donald D., Sherman R. Emery, and Stanley Abercrombie. "About Us." Interior Design. Shadow, 2014. Web. 30 Nov. 2015

External links
 , the magazine's official website
 , interior design course's official website

Visual arts magazines published in the United States
Monthly magazines published in the United States
Arts and crafts magazines
Design magazines
English-language magazines
Interior design
Magazines established in 1932
Magazines published in New York City